George Paul DiCaprio (born October 2, 1943) is an American writer, editor, publisher, distributor, and former performance artist, known for his work in the realm of underground comix. DiCaprio has collaborated with Timothy Leary and Laurie Anderson. He is the father of actor Leonardo DiCaprio.

Biography 
DiCaprio was born to George Leon DiCaprio and Olga Anne Jacobs. His father was the son of Italian immigrants, Salvatore Di Caprio and Rosina Cassella, and his mother was of German descent.

DiCaprio was active in underground comix throughout the 1970s, as a writer, editor, publisher, and distributor. He is known for such titles as Greaser Comics, Forbidden Knowledge, and Cocaine Comix, collaborating with artists such as Laurie Anderson, Pete von Sholly, and Rich Chidlaw. (His own self-publishing imprint was known as Half-Ass Press.) As a distributor in the 1970s and 1980s, he supplied West Coast retailers with underground and independent comics.

He was also a performance artist. Comics writer Harvey Pekar details a DiCaprio performance in Los Angeles in February 1988 where DiCaprio claimed that he did, "a light show using brine shrimp and worms. I'd hit 'em with cold water and they'd move around and I'd project 'em on a wall magnified. It blew people's minds."

DiCaprio played an important role in his son's early career as an actor. He used to screen scripts for him, and was instrumental in getting Leo to portray Arthur Rimbaud in the 1995 film Total Eclipse.

Since 2008, DiCaprio works as an executive producer in the film industry, mainly for documentaries and short films; one of his first assignments was as a co-executive producer of the TV series Greensburg, initiated by his son Leonardo.

In 2021, he gave his screen debut as Mr. Jack in Paul Thomas Anderson's film Licorice Pizza.

Personal life 
DiCaprio met Irmelin Indenbirken (born 1945), a German immigrant, in college; the two later married and moved to Los Angeles. The couple had one son, Leonardo DiCaprio, and divorced shortly after, when Leonardo was a year old. While Leonardo lived mostly with his mother, his parents agreed to live next door to each other so as not to deprive him of his father's presence in his life.

Written works
Baloney Moccasins (Half-Ass Press, 1970) – features artwork by Laurie Anderson
 Greaser Comics #1 (Half-Ass Press, 1971) – stories illustrated by Richard Jaccoma
Greaser Comics #2 (Rip Off Press, July 1972) – stories illustrated by Jim Janes
 Forbidden Knowledge #1–2 (Last Gasp, 1975, 1978) – edited by DiCaprio & Pete von Sholly, with contributions from Robert Williams, Rich Chidlaw, Matt Golden, Brent Boates, Art Vitello, Milt Gray, Jean Paul Laurens, Jim Himes, Icelandic Codpiece Comics Studio, Dennis Ellis, Chris Lane, Warren Greenwood, Doug Hansen, Pete Von X (a.k.a. Pete von Sholly), and Johnny Edgar
Arcade: The Comics Revue #5 (Print Mint, Spring 1976) – "Anthony and the Temptations," illustrated by Justin Green
Cocaine Comix #1-4 (Last Gasp, 1976–1982) – co-edited with Rich Chidlaw; multiple stories written by DiCaprio and illustrated by Chidlaw
Neurocomics (Last Gasp, 1979) – with Timothy Leary, Tim Kummero, and Pete von Sholly
 Yama Yama/The Ugly Head (self-published, 1981) – flip book made in response to Gary Panter and burgeoning punk art scene; Robert Williams illustrated "Yama Yama" while S. Clay Wilson illustrated "The Ugly Head"
Hoo-Bee-Boo #1 (1982)

References

External links

Leonardo DiCaprio
Timothy Leary
1943 births
American cartoonists
American male writers
American people of German descent
American performance artists
American writers of Italian descent
Living people
Underground cartoonists
20th-century American artists